Klamputė is a hamlet in Kėdainiai district municipality, in Kaunas County, in central Lithuania. It is located by the Smilgaitis river and Keleriškiai pond, 3 km from Kėdainiai. According to the 2011 census, the hamlet has a population of 0 people.  

The hamlet was depopulated after 1989 (the last census data with population being detected).

Demography

References

Villages in Kaunas County
Kėdainiai District Municipality